Newlands Cross is a well-known junction in the south-west of County Dublin. It is the point where the N7 National Route to the South West and Mid West crosses an orbital local route, the R113. For many years this area roughly marked the place where Dublin City ended and the "country" began, though it is now inside the urban area.  

The R113 (in the form of the Belgard Road dual-carriageway) joins Newlands to Tallaght in the South and to the Fonthill Road in Clondalkin village to the North; the cross itself is located at the southern end of Clondalkin.

By 2007, the signal-controlled junction was suffering serious traffic congestion and the upgrade to a grade-separated interchange was planned. The upgraded N7 would pass over the R113. Construction went to tender in August 2008 and preparatory work started in September 2008. Following delays, construction proper started in June 2013 and was expected to be completed in May 2015. The new flyover opened to traffic ahead of schedule on 20 November 2014 and eliminated the last signal-controlled crossing on the N7/M7 route between the M50 and Limerick. Prior to the flyover the junction was also notable as the only set of traffic lights on the cross-country route between Cork and Northern Ireland. Further works continued on the slip roads alongside the flyover until March 2015.

Crime journalist Veronica Guerin was shot and killed in 1996, while queuing in traffic at nearby Boot Road junction (now closed). A memorial to her is located at the site of the incident, the "Boot Road" slip approximately 300 metres west of the junction.

References

External links
Map of Newlands Cross
 http://www.irishtimes.com/news/environment/newlands-cross-flyover-opens-ahead-of-schedule-1.2005573

Clondalkin
Transport in South Dublin (county)